Sarhad: The Border of Crime is a 1995 Hindi action crime drama directed by Mahendra Shah and starring Deepak Tijori in the lead role.

Plot
The plot revolves around Prakash, Sandhya, their baby, and Deepak, an engineering student and younger brother of Prakash, and the dangerous criminal Kundecha. Kundecha's evil eye falls on Sandhya who is working as a locker in charge in one of his banks. From the day Sandhya and Prakash discovered that the bank stores cocaine, their family comes in dangerous clutches of Kundecha. Wherever they went for help, Kundecha's goons thwarted them. They cannot face Kundecha and his strong power so they kill themselves, leaving Prakash to face the menace of Kundecha, which he does with his intelligence and presence of mind.

Cast

Deepak Tijori as Deepak Mathur
Rutika as Jyoti Chikalia
Farah Naaz as Sandhya Mathur
Raj Babbar as Prakash Mathur
Anil Dhawan as Police Inspector Anil Srivastav
Danny Denzongpa as Gundecha
Sudhir Dalvi as DIG Saxena
Kulbhushan Kharbanda as Chikalia as Manager of main Branch
Deven Bhojani as  Deven, College friend of Deepak
Javed Khan Amrohi as Kapadia, Branch Manager of Gundecha Bank (murdered)
Tiku Talsania as Hotel Owner (uncredited)
Mushtaq Khan as Lobo, Dog Trainer
Dinesh Hingoo as Francis
Mac Mohan as Mac
Chandrashekhar Dubey as Police Constable
Shashi Kiran as Press Reporter/Editor
Rinku Dhawan as Hotel Customer (uncredited/guest role)
Anil Nagrath as Professor Sinha Deepak's College Principal

Music
" Aapko Dekh Kar Chha Gaya Kya Suroor" - Kumar Sanu, Kavita Krishnamurthy
"Doodh Ban Jaaoongi Malai Ban Jaaoongi" - Asha Bhosle
"Kangna Kya Kehta Hai" - Udit Narayan, Kavita Krishnamurthy
"Mujhe To Tumse Pyar Hai" - Kavita Krishnamurthy, Baba Sehgal
"Suno Yaar Mere" - Kumar Sanu
"Suno Yaar Mere (Duet)" - Kumar Sanu, Sadhana Sargam

References

External links 

1995 films
1990s Hindi-language films
1995 crime drama films
Indian crime drama films